Beatrice Chepkoech Sitonik (born 6 July 1991) is a Kenyan long-distance runner who specialises in the 3000 metres steeplechase. 
She won gold medals at the 2019 World Championships, and 2018 African Championships. Chepkoech took also bronze in the 1500 metres at the 2015 African Games. She is the current world record holder in 3000 m steeplechase with a time of 8:44.32 set in 2018 in Monaco. With that mark she became the first woman to break the 8:50 and 8:45 barriers.

Chepkoech is a two-time 3000 m steeplechase Diamond League champion.

Biography
Beatrice Chepkoech began her career in road running, taking top three placings in 2014 at several low-key races in Germany and the Netherlands. She switched to track running in 2015 and set a 1500 m personal best of 4:03.28 minutes to win at the KBC Night of Athletics. This time placed her just outside the top twenty athletes for the season and she was the fifth fastest Kenyan. A bronze medal in the event followed at the 2015 African Games.

Chepkoech ended her 2015 season with a run in the 2000 metres steeplechase at the ISTAF Berlin and this prompted her to try the full 3000 m Olympic event. She made a successful transition and on the 2016 IAAF Diamond League circuit she ran 9:17.41 minutes for fourth at the Prefontaine Classic before taking second at the Stockholm Diamond League. She ranked fifth in the world upon entry to the 2016 Rio Olympics.

She finished second in the 1500 m at the 2018 Commonwealth Games in Gold Coast, Australia.

In July 2018, Chepkoech shaved eight seconds off the women's world record in the 3000 m steeplechase, winning Monaco Herculis race in 8:44.32 (highlights ). She earned overall Diamond League title in her specialist event that year, securing three victories out of five events including final in Brussels.

In 2019, she competed in the senior women's race at the 2019 World Cross Country Championships held in Aarhus, Denmark. She finished in seventh place. Chepkoech won her second 3000 m steeplechase Diamond Trophy that year, winning four of five events including final in Zürich.

She broke the women's 5 km road world record (mixed race) in a time of 14 minutes 43 seconds at the Morocco Run in February 2021. The previous world record in that event was set by Caroline Kipkirui in 2018 with 14:48. Siffan Hassen ran a 5k race in 2019 (women only) with 14:44.

Achievements
All information from World Athletics profile.

International competitions

Circuit wins and titles, National championships
 Diamond League champion 3000 m steeplechase (2):  2018,  2019
 2017 (1): Paris Meeting
 2018 (3): Paris, Monaco Herculis, Brussels Memorial Van Damme
 2019 (4): Shanghai Diamond League (WL ), Prefontaine Classic in Stanford, CA (WL MR), Birmingham British Grand Prix (MR), Zürich Weltklasse
 Kenyan Athletics Championships
 1500 metres: 2017
 3000 metres steeplechase: 2018

Personal bests
 1500 metres – 4:03.09 (Gold Coast 2018)
 3000 metres – 8:22.92 (Doha 2020)
 2000 metres steeplechase – 6:02.47 (Berlin 2015)
 3000 metres steeplechase – 8:44.32 (Monaco 2018) World record
Road
 5 km – 14:43 (Monaco 2021)
 10 km – 32:35 (Hem 2014)

References

External links

 

Living people
1991 births
Kenyan female steeplechase runners
Kenyan female middle-distance runners
Olympic athletes of Kenya
Athletes (track and field) at the 2016 Summer Olympics
Athletes (track and field) at the 2015 African Games
Athletes (track and field) at the 2018 Commonwealth Games
African Games bronze medalists for Kenya
African Games medalists in athletics (track and field)
Kenyan female cross country runners
Commonwealth Games medallists in athletics
Commonwealth Games silver medallists for Kenya
People from Kericho County
World Athletics Championships athletes for Kenya
World Athletics Championships medalists
World Athletics Championships winners
Diamond League winners
African Championships in Athletics winners
IAAF Continental Cup winners
Athletes (track and field) at the 2020 Summer Olympics
Medallists at the 2018 Commonwealth Games